The 2015–16 season was Torino Football Club's 105th season of competitive football, 88th season in the top division of Italian football and 71st season in Serie A. The club finished in 12th place in Serie A, and were eliminated in the round of 16 in the Coppa Italia.

Players

Squad information

Transfers

Summer 2015

In

Out

Out

Winter 2015–16

In

Out

Competitions

Serie A

League table

Results summary

Results by round

Matches

Coppa Italia

Statistics

Appearances and goals

|-
! colspan="14" style="background:#dcdcdc; text-align:center"| Goalkeepers

|-
! colspan="14" style="background:#dcdcdc; text-align:center"| Defenders

|-
! colspan="14" style="background:#dcdcdc; text-align:center"| Midfielders

|-
! colspan="14" style="background:#dcdcdc; text-align:center"| Forwards

|-
! colspan="14" style="background:#dcdcdc; text-align:center"| Players transferred out during the season

Goalscorers

Last updated: 15 May 2016

Clean sheets
Last updated: 15 May 2016

Bibliography

References

Torino F.C. seasons
Torino